Sid Bel Abbès District is an important region in north-western Algeria which plays host to many communes and towns in its geographic location.

See also
Sidi Bel Abbès

Districts of Sidi Bel Abbès Province